Mohammad Reza Pour Ebrahimi (born: in 1970, Rafsanjan) is an Iranian Twelver Shia principlist representative of Kerman and Ravar in the Islamic Consultative Assembly (Majles). He has been a member of the Majles in three successive periods, namely at the 9th legislature of the Islamic Republic of Iran, 10th and 11th (the current) periods of the parliament; he has been active as the head of economic-commission of the parliament, too.

Life and education 
Pour-Ebrahimi born in Rafsanjan and finished his elementary education in the city. He studied at the subject of business-management at the University of Isfahan in 1990; Later on, he kept on his studies at Shahid Beheshti University in 1995 for a MA degree in business-management (financial orientation). After finishing the mentioned course, Pour-Ebrahimi taught at the universities of Isfahan and Kerman as a teacher in specialized courses in the subject of management/accounting/economics. Afterwards he entered the University of Tehran in the doctoral-program in financial management and received his doctorate degree from this university. Mohammad Reza is currently a member as academic-personnel at Shahid Beheshti University, Tehran (at the Faculty of Management).

See also 
 Mohammad Mehdi Zahedi
 Effat Shariati

References

1970 births
Living people
Members of the Islamic Consultative Assembly by term
Members of the 11th Islamic Consultative Assembly
People from Rafsanjan
People from Kerman